Ahmad Abdul-Karim Ahmad (born 28 April 1992 in Baghdad) is an Iraqi boxer.  At the 2012 Summer Olympics, he competed in the Men's welterweight, but was defeated in the first round by South African Siphiwe Lusizi.

References

Iraqi male boxers
1992 births
Living people
Sportspeople from Baghdad
Olympic boxers of Iraq
Boxers at the 2012 Summer Olympics
Welterweight boxers